Theresa Logar (born March 10, 1985), now Theresa Mullane, is an American former professional tennis player.

A left-handed player from Rochester Hills, Michigan, Logar earned a wildcard into the women's singles main draw of the 2003 US Open by winning the USTA 18s National Championships and was beaten in the first round by Maria Kirilenko.

Logar was a varsity tennis player at Stanford University while studying for a degree in international relations.

ITF finals

Singles: 2 (0–2)

References

External links
 
 

1985 births
Living people
American female tennis players
Tennis people from Michigan
People from Rochester Hills, Michigan
Stanford Cardinal women's tennis players